The Financial Secretary is the title held by the Hong Kong government minister who is responsible for all economic and financial matters (“Department of Finance” per Article 60 of the Basic Law). The position is among the three most senior Principal Officials of the Government, second only to the Chief Secretary in the order of precedence (but not subordinate to the CS). Together with other secretaries, the Financial Secretary is accountable to the Legislative Council and the Chief Executive (the Governor before the 1997 transfer of sovereignty) for his actions in supervising the formulation and implementation of financial and economic policies.

The position evolved out of the office of the Colonial Treasurer before 1940. The Financial Secretary is a member of the Executive Council, and gives advice to the Chief Executive in that capacity. He is also responsible for delivering the annual budget to the Legislative Council. To date, it is the only office among the three highest Principal Officials of the Government (Chief Secretary, Financial Secretary, and Secretary for Justice/Attorney General) not to have been occupied by a woman.

The incumbent Financial Secretary is Paul Chan Mo-po.

List of Secretaries

Secretaries and Treasurers to the Superintendent, 1842–1844
 Edward Elmslie, 1842–1843
 Charles Edward Stewart, 1843–1844

Colonial Treasurers, 1844–1937

Financial Secretaries, 1937–1941

Financial Secretaries, 1946–1997

Financial Secretaries, 1997–present
Political party:

Residence

The Financial Secretary's residence is on 45 Shouson Hill Road in Deep Water Bay. It is listed as a grade 2 building.  Described as a two-story neo-Georgian style residence built in 1935 and originally owned by Sir Shouson Chow as his own residence. The first Financial Secretary who moved into the building was Sir Charles Geoffrey Shield Follows.

See also

References

External links
Financial Secretary

Positions of the Hong Kong Government